María Rosa Torre González (30 August 1890 – 13 February 1973) was born in the state of Yucatán, Mexico. She was the first woman in Mexico to hold an elected office.

Early life
María Rosa Torre González was born on the 30 August 1890 in Mérida, Yucatán, Mexico to Sofía Torre. Her grandparents were Paula González and Gregorio Torre, whose surnames she used to mask the difficult circumstances of being an illegitimate child. She attended the Girls' Literary Institute operated by Rita Cetina Gutiérrez, an innovative teacher who rejected teaching girls only domestic skills, teaching instead feminist theory as well as a curriculum including astronomy, constitutional law, geometry, geography, history, and mathematics.

Career 
In 1910, Torre began working at the girls' neighborhood school in the colonia of Santa Ana. After four years, she transferred to the kindergarten attached to the normal school and worked there until 1917.

At the age of 14, in 1910, Torre joined the supporters of Francisco I. Madero as a propagandist. With Madero's assassination, Torre became involved in espionage against the coup leader Victoriano Huerta in 1913. When Venustiano Carranza secured Huerta's agreement to step down and sent Salvador Alvarado to quell the rebellion in Yucatán, Torre served as a nurse with Alvarado's troops. By March, 1915, Alvarado's troops had taken the city of Mérida and Torre entered the state Normal School.

In 1916, as part of his socialist regime, Alvarado called for a feminist congress to be convened. Torre served as a promoter for the gathering traveling to Acanceh, Temax and Motul to boost attendance of qualified women.
In January 1916 the Primer Congreso Feminista (First Feminist Congress) was held and topics discussed were education, including sexual education; religious fanaticism; legal rights and reforms; equal employment opportunity; and intellectual equality among others. At the Second Congress, held later that same year, Torre served as President.

Torre assisted Elvia Carrillo Puerto in establishing the Liga Rita Cetina Gutierrez (League of Rita Cetina Gutiérrez) in 1919. The group "campaigned against prostitution, drugs, alcohol and superstition" and gave educational talks about birth control, child care, economics and hygiene. They also inspected hospitals and schools and helped to found the state orphanage. In coordination with Elvia, Torre set up over 45 feminist leagues over the next few years and organized over 5,500 workers.

In 1922, at the urging of Governor Felipe Carrillo Puerto urged the legislature of the state to allow women to vote and hold office. Torre ran for a seat on the City Council of Mérida and won, becoming the first woman in Mexico to hold an elective office. Her term was cut short with the assassination of Carrillo Puerto, but Torre was proud of her service and aware that the achievement was a symbol for other women.

Torre attended the Primer Congreso Interamericano de Mujeres (First Inter-American Congress of Women) held on 27 August 1947 in Guatemala City, which had the goal of discussing how to attain equality between men and women and suffrage throughout the Americas. Torre was the delegate of Liga Internacional y People's Mandate of Querétaro and was accompanied by Judith Horcasitas de Forgerave representing the Civil Service of Mexican Women, Emilia Loyola representing the teachers of Mexico City, and Elena Sánchez Valenzuela representing teachers and the Secretary of Education of Coahuila.

Personal life 
María Rosa Torre González died alone in Mexico City, on 13 February 1973. Her death has been described as "lonely" since she did not have any siblings, nor did she marry.

References 

1890 births
1973 deaths
Mexican women's rights activists
People from Yucatán
Mexican feminists
Mexican educators